Delta City is a brand of shopping center, with malls in Belgrade, Serbia and Podgorica, Montenegro.

Delta City Belgrade

Delta City Belgrade construction began on 22 March 2006. Designed by Israeli architects MYS, the project cost €74 million. It then opened on 1 November 2007.

Delta City Belgrade is located in New Belgrade's Blok 67. With floor area of 87,000 m2, it is the first shopping mall of its size in Serbia. Its total gross leasable area is 30,000 m2. Some of the stores in the mall are H&M, Zara, Calvin Klein Underwear, Adidas, Sport Vision, Fashion & Friends, N fashion, Bershka, Sephora, CT shop, Pull and Bear, Tom Tailor, Massimo Dutti, Stradivarius, Tezenis, Geox, Office Shoes, and others.

The mall also includes 15 restaurants as well as three restaurant chains: Kentucky Fried Chicken, McDonald's and Monument.

Austrian Cineplexx operates multiplex cinema with eight screens. There is also cafés, fast food courts, children's playgrounds, and 130 retail units. The largest tenant is Super Maxi supermarket. In total, there are over 1,200 parking places on five decks above the ground, and one underground.

The mall is located on the same block as Belville. Delta City can serve 200,000 people within a 10-minute walk, and 600,000 within a ten-minute drive.

Delta City Podgorica

Delta City Podgorica is the first and the largest shopping mall in Podgorica. It was built at a cost of €60 million, and was opened on October 1, 2008.

The mall is built in the new part of Podgorica, on the junction of roads towards Cetinje and Nikšić. It has a total floor area of 48,000 m2, with gross leasable area of 24,000 m2.

The prominent stores are similar to that of Belgrade mall: Nike, Zara, Mexx, Marks & Spencer, Tommy Hilfiger, Mango, Esprit, Oysho, Bershka, Pull and Bear, Stradivarius, Tally Weijl, Geox, Nine West, Guess, NewYorker, Office Shoes, and more.

What Podgorica mall is lacking is international food chains, so there is no Kentucky Fried Chicken or McDonald's, but there is a Costa Coffee outlet. The mall also features some local brands of fast food restaurants.

Mall also features a Cineplexx 6 screen multiplex cinema, and largest supermarket in Montenegro, Super Maxi. A large garage that spans the length of the mall at its back, and open parking in front make up for some 1,000 parking spaces.

Delta City Podgorica is the first large shopping mall in Montenegro, and it probably will not face competition from mall of similar size in Podgorica soon, with the possible exception of Mall of Montenegro.

Delta Planet Autokomanda

Delta Planet is a planned shopping mall, to be built and operated by Delta Holding in Belgrade, Serbia. This is double the "Delta City" and the  larger than "Usce". Or, in other words measured, it is an area of 24 football fields (105 times 68 meters, according to the standards laid down by UEFA). Commencement of works is planned for end of 2012 and the completion of the shopping mall in the second half of 2014.

In the building will be invested 200 million euros and will be completed in the fall 2014th year.

New design is presenting us with a center of 200,000 square meters of total area with 250 different shops. Shops, services, restaurants and cafes are spread on two levels with a simple communication around the building. Below these two levels there will be a hypermarket, and on the top level is located a part designed for entertainment with cinema, spa and wellness area, various sports facilities and a similar offers for fans of healthy living.

A special feature is a large green garden that will be located on the roof, covering an area of 6,500 square meters. In addition, it will hold the first IMAX theater in Serbia, as well as 50 completely new brands on Serbian market. All visitors will have 2300 parking spaces at their disposal, whether it's underground garage or outdoor parking.

Among the other announcements we want to draw attention to the solution of the facade. It will practically have two faces, where side looking toward the highway will hold impressive LED display of about 5000 square meters, while the opposite side of the building as a contrast will be set up with vertical greenery and plant facade made all of natural materials. LED display will have the extraordinary features and dynamic colors to draw admiring glances from all drivers on the highway, while the side toward Tabanovačka Street will create a green wall and pleasant setting with paths for all passers-by. The main entrance to the building will be from the direction of the roundabout Autokomanda with spacious plaza and outdoor cafes. It also stated that the center will use modern green technology, so the center will have their own wells for technical water, renewable energy sources, and special emphasis is placed on energy efficiency.

See also
MPC Properties
Maxi (Serbian supermarket)
Mall of Montenegro

References

External links
Delta City 
Delta City Podgorica - Montenegro
Ster Cinemas Montenegro located in Delta City Podgorica

Tourist attractions in Belgrade
Tourist attractions in Podgorica
Shopping malls in Belgrade
Shopping malls established in 2007
Shopping malls in Podgorica